Harutaeographa pallida is a moth of the family Noctuidae. It is found in Nepal and China (Yunnan).

References

Moths described in 1993
Orthosiini